Spyridium furculentum, commonly known as forked spyridium, is a species of flowering plant in the family Rhamnaceae and is endemic to a small area of Victoria in Australia. It is a shrub with softly-hairy young stems, Y-shaped leaves, and head of white to cream-coloured flowers.

Description
The edges of the leaves are rolled under and the lower surface is covered with star-shaped hairs.

Taxonomy
Spyridium furculentum was first formally described in 2012 by William Barker and Jürgen Kellermann in the journal Muelleria from specimens collected south of the Little Desert National Park boundary in 1995. The specific epithet (furculentum) is derived from Latin, meaning "forked" and "marked development", referring to the prominently forked leaves.

Distribution
This species of Spyridium grows in mallee woodland south of the Little Desert National Park, between Goroke and Dimboola.

Conservation status
This species is listed as "endangered" under the Australian Government Environment Protection and Biodiversity Conservation Act 1999 and as "critically endangered" under the Victorian Government Flora and Fauna Guarantee Act 1988. The main threats to the species include road maintenance, clearance of native vegetation, trampling by apiarists, and weed invasion.

References

furculentum
Rosales of Australia
Flora of Victoria (Australia)
Plants described in 2012
Taxa named by William Robert Barker